The Eaton Family Residence-Jewish Center of Norwich is a historic home located at 72 S. Broad Street in Norwich, Chenango County, New York.  It was built in 1914 and is a -story, tan brick residence with a green ceramic tile, side-gabled roof resting on a cut stone foundation in the Colonial Revival style.  The main block is rectangular, five bays wide and two bays deep.  The main entrance is set within a prominent one bay wood portico with gabled roof supported by paired, fluted classical columns.  Starting in 1955, it has been used as a synagogue and community center by local German-Jewish refugees.

It was added to the National Register of Historic Places in 2009.

References

Colonial Revival architecture in New York (state)
German-Jewish culture in New York (state)
Houses on the National Register of Historic Places in New York (state)
Properties of religious function on the National Register of Historic Places in New York (state)
Houses completed in 1914
Houses in Chenango County, New York
National Register of Historic Places in Chenango County, New York
Colonial Revival synagogues
Synagogues completed in 1914